Godolphin School is an independent boarding and day school for girls in Salisbury, England, which was founded in 1726 and opened in 1784. The school educates girls between the ages of three and eighteen.

History
Godolphin was founded by Elizabeth Godolphin using her own money and some from the estate of her husband, Charles. She created the school originally for the education of eight young orphaned gentlewomen. According to the terms of the will, the beneficiaries were to be daughters of members of the Church of England, between eight and twelve years of age, born in Salisbury or some other Wiltshire town, and to have had "some portion left to them but not exceeding £400".

The girls were to be taught to "dance, work, read, write, cast accounts and the business of housewifery". This was a fairly advanced curriculum for its time, since girls of this class were expected to be able to read but not necessarily to be able to write. The new charity was initially to be administered by her nephew William Godolphin and his heirs, The dean and chapter declined to take on the task on the grounds that the idea of educating women was "mere foolery and dreaming". Every year, in November, the school commemorates its founder Elizabeth Godolphin when the head girl, accompanied by members of the upper sixth, lay a wreath on her tomb in the cloister of Westminster Abbey. This ceremony is known to girls past and present as "Commem."

The school did not open its doors until 9 August 1784, when it was set up in Rosemary Lane, in the Cathedral Close, Salisbury. It later occupied various houses in the vicinity, including Arundells, more recently the home of Sir Edward Heath, and finally the King's House. A prospectus of 1789, written by the headmistress, Mrs Voysey, promised a regime of early rising, "agreeable exercise" and a diet of wholesome books "such as enlarge the heart to Virtue and excellency of Sentiment".

Following an outbreak of cholera in 1848, the school moved to Milford Hill, where for nearly half a century it occupied various premises, including Fawcett House on Elm Grove, which was later to become the Swan School. Under the leadership of Miss Polhill (1854–1857) and M. T. Andrews (1875–1890), numbers were small and the curriculum narrow. Then, in 1890, Mary Douglas arrived. Described variously as a 'headmistress of genius' and 'the second founder of the School', her headship saw a tenfold increase in numbers from 23 in 1890 to 230 in 1920, the year she retired. In 1891, the distinctive red-brick building on the top of Milford Hill was opened at a cost of £4000, and in the years that followed several new boarding houses were added. During the 1890s school fees were 4 guineas per term for pupils under 12, 5 guineas for pupils from 12 to 15, and 6 guineas for pupils over 15.

In 1904 an additional six acres were purchased to extend the school grounds, which were then landscaped on the side facing Laverstock. In 1914 oak panelling, which gives the hall its unique atmosphere, was installed; and in 1925 an open-air swimming pool was opened. Additions to the school since the Second World War have included a new library building, several new boarding houses, a science and technology block, a prep school, a performing arts centre, an indoor swimming pool with fitness centre, a new boarding house and a Sixth Form Centre. 

The arms and motto of the school are those of the Godolphin family. The motto Franc ha leal eto ge is Old Cornish and means 'Frank and loyal art thou'.

The formal uniform includes a blazer, skirt, shirt, a traditional "pinny" and boater.

Godolphin was awarded the Sunday Times Southwest Independent Secondary School of the Year 2019.

Headmistresses

 Mrs Voysey
1784–: Miss Giffard (Mrs Davis)
1815–: Anna Maria Alford
1829–: Miss Emily
1832–1854: Margaret Bazeley
1854–1857: Miss Polhill (Mrs Cother)
1857–1875: Emma Polhill
1875–1890: M. T. Andrews
1890–1919: Mary Alice Douglas
1920–1935: Cecily Ray Ash
1935–1940: D. M. M. Edwards-Rees
1940–1958: G. May Jerred
1958–1967: Miss Engledow
1968–1980: Veronica Fraser
1980–1989: Elizabeth Prescott-Decie (Hannay)
1989–1996: Hilary Fender
1996–2010: Jill Horsburgh
2010–2013: Samantha Price
2014–2022: Emma Hattersley
2022– : Jenny Price

Notable former pupils

Antonia Bernath, actor
Sheila Callender, haematologist
Mary Cartwright, mathematician
Jilly Cooper, writer
Molly Harrower, psychologist
Deborah Meaden, business entrepreneur
Dame Anna Pauffley, High Court judge
Isabel Quigly, novelist and award-winning translator
Dorothy L. Sayers, writer
Mary Spender, singer and songwriter
Dorothy Spicer, aviatrix, first woman to gain an advanced qualification in aeronautical engineering
Catherine Steadman, actor and writer
Theodora Turner, nurse
Minette Walters, writer
Hannah White, sailor

References

The Godolphin Book, compiled by Mary Alice Douglas, published 1928

External links

Muddy Stilettos Review
Good Schools Guide Review
Tatler Schools Guide 2019
Sunday Times Southwest Independent Secondary School of the Year 2019
ISI Inspection Reports

Private schools in Wiltshire
Girls' schools in Wiltshire
Educational institutions established in 1726
1726 establishments in England
Boarding schools in Wiltshire
Member schools of the Girls' Schools Association
Schools in Salisbury